George Batten (June 19, 1854 Gloucester County, New Jersey – February 16, 1918 Montclair, New Jersey) was a former N. W. Ayer & Son employee who opened the George Batten Newspaper Advertising Agency on Park Row in New York City in 1891. His $8 million billing agency was merged with the $23 million Barton, Durstine & Osborn (BDO) in 1928, after both agencies had moved into the new office building at 383 Madison Avenue, to create BBDO. Batten's work overseeing advertising for the West Anderson Pork Pie Company caused a furore in his native New Jersey.

Batten died on February 16, 1918, aged 63, at his home in Montclair, New Jersey. William H. Johns took over the company.

References

1854 births
1918 deaths
American advertising executives
People from Gloucester County, New Jersey
People from Montclair, New Jersey

19th-century American businesspeople